The Queen's Award for Enterprise: International Trade (Export) (1983) was awarded on 21 April 1983, by Queen Elizabeth II.

Recipients
The following organisations were awarded this year.

 Acrow PLC, London, W12
 R. P. Adam Ltd, Selkirk
 Airwork Ltd, Christchurch, Dorset
 The Water Specialities and Services Business of Albright and Wilson Ltd, Warley, West Midlands
 Allied Colloids Ltd, Bradford, West Yorkshire
 Amersham International PLC, Amersham, Buckinghamshire
 The Export Division of Anglia Canners Ltd, Rickmansworth, Hertfordshire
 A. and P. Appledore International Ltd, Killingworth, Newcastle-Upon-Tyne
 Architects Co-Partnership Incorporated, Potters Bar, Hertfordshire
 Atlas Converting Equipment Ltd, Kempston, Bedfordshire
 Audio Kinetics (UK) Ltd, Borehamwood, Hertfordshire
 B.K.S. Surveys Ltd, Coleraine, Co. Londonderry
 Badalex Ltd, Weybridge, Surrey
 Balfour Beatty, Ltd, Thornton Heath, Surrey
 Arthur Bell and Sons PLC, Perth
 Biwater Treatment Ltd, Dorking, Surrey
 The Aircraft Group of British Aerospace PLC, Kingston-Upon-Thames, Surrey
 The Computer and Telecommunications Department of British Airways, Hounslow, Middlesex
 Carbolite Furnaces Ltd, Sheffield
 Carreras Rothmans Ltd, Basildon, Essex
 The Chubb Fire Vehicles Division of Chubb Fire Security Ltd, Sunbury-on-Thames, Middlesex
 Coin Controls Ltd, Oldham, Lancashire
 Compton Webb Group Marketing Ltd, Newport, Gwent
 Costain International Ltd, London, SE1
 The Automotive Products Division of the Fabrics Product Group of Courtaulds PLC, Worsley, Manchester
 Crisp Malting Ltd, Fakenham, Norfolk
 Cummins Engine Company Ltd, Darlington, Co. Durham
 Curtis (Wool) Holdings Ltd, Keighley, West Yorkshire
 Dale Electric of Great Britain Ltd, Filey, North Yorkshire
 Darlington and Simpson Rolling Mills PLC, Darlington, Co. Durham
 Databit Ltd, Northampton
 Davy McKee (Sheffield) Ltd, Sheffield
 Dawson International PLC, Kinross, Tayside
 Thomas De La Rue and Company Ltd, Basingstoke, Hampshire
 Derwent Publications Ltd, London, WC1
 Dormer Underwriting Agencies Ltd, London, EC3
 Eilers and Wheeler (UK) Ltd, London, EC1
 Elco Power Plant Ltd, Tadcaster, North Yorkshire
 Euromoney Publications Ltd, London, EC4
 Exploration Consultants Ltd, Henley-on-Thames, Oxfordshire
 Express Dairy UK Ltd, South Ruislip, Middlesex
 Fabrikat Industries Ltd, Nottingham
 The Re-inforcements/CemFIL Division of Fibreglass Ltd, St. Helen's, Merseyside
 Foster Wheeler World Services Ltd, Reading, Berkshire
 GEC Electrical Projects Ltd, Rugby, Warwickshire
 Gaeltec Ltd, Dunvegan, Isle of Skye
 Michael Gerson Ltd, London, N20
 Glantre Engineering Ltd, Wembley, Middlesex
 Griffin-Woodhouse Ltd, Warley, West Midlands
 Guinness Overseas Ltd, London, NW10
 Harrison Bros. (Sanitary Engineers) Ltd, Ilkley, West Yorkshire
 Hosking Equipment Ltd, Melton Constable, Norfolk
 The Hughes Tool Division of Hughes Tool Company Ltd, Belfast
 Insight International Tours Ltd, London, SW1
 Intergen Beauty Products Ltd, Eastbourne, East Sussex
 Investment Insurance International (Managers) Ltd, London, EC3
 T. W. Kempton Ltd, Leicester
 Kurvers International Supply Services Ltd, London, SW3
 Land and Marine Engineering (Overseas) Ltd, Wirral, Merseyside
 Lasgo Exports Ltd, London, NW10
 The Scammell Motor Plant of Leyland Vehicles Ltd, Watford, Hertfordshire
 Liquid Gas Equipment Ltd, Loanhead, Midlothian
 Lofthouse of Fleetwood Ltd, Fleetwood, Lancashire
 Lovaux Ltd, Bracknell, Berkshire
 McCorquodale Machine Systems Ltd, Crewe, Cheshire
 Marconi Avionics Ltd, Rochester, Kent
 Robert Matthew, Johnson-Marshall and Partners, Edinburgh
 May and Baker Ltd, Rainham, Essex
 Metier Management Systems Ltd, London, NW10
 Multispec Ltd, Wheldrake, York
 The Horseley Bridge Unit of NEI Thompson Ltd, Tipton, West Midlands
 Ocean Inchcape Ltd, London, EC3
 Oxford Medical Systems Ltd, Abingdon, Oxfordshire
 Pauls and Sandars Ltd, Ipswich, Suffolk
 Petbow Ltd, Sandwich, Kent
 Presspart Manufacturing Ltd, Blackburn, Lancashire
 The Electronic Warfare Division of Racal-Decca Defence Systems (Radar) Ltd, Chessington, Surrey
 Racal-Tacticom Ltd, Reading, Berkshire
 Rimark Soft Drinks Ltd, Wellingborough, Northamptonshire
 The Buckeye Company Division of South Western Chicks (Warren) Ltd, Hempsted, Gloucestershire
 The Submarine Systems Division of Standard Telephones and Cables PLC, London, SE10
 Hugh Steeper (Roehampton) Ltd, London, SW15
 Technicare International Ltd, Newbury, Berkshire
 Technitube Pipe and Steel (UK) Ltd, Horsham, West Sussex
 Tecquipment Ltd, Nottingham
 Transunits Ltd, Thetford, Norfolk
 United Medical Enterprises Ltd, London, SW1
 Wellman Furnaces Ltd, Warley, West Midlands
 Woods of Windsor Ltd, Windsor, Berkshire
 YRM Partnership, London, EC1

References

Queen's Award for Enterprise: International Trade (Export)
1983 in the United Kingdom